Christophe Dettinger (born 3 May 1981) is a French boxer.

Boxing career 
October 30, 2007, he became the French champion in the Cruiserweight weight class, by beating Kamel Amrane.

Yellow vests movement 
Several videos taken during the demonstration of the Yellow vests movement of January 5, 2019 in Paris were showing him punching policemen on the Passerelle Léopold-Sédar-Senghor. Three days after punching police at Yellow vests protest, Christophe Dettinger surrendered himself. A website set up to raise funds for the boxer showed that it had received pledges of more than €114,000  The fundraiser was closed after less than 20 hours after officials expressed outrage. Anti-corruption campaigner Christophe Grébert defended the fund, saying it was legal to ask for funds to pay court costs. Shutting the fundraiser, he said, was a "bad signal for democracy".

On 13 February 2019, Dettinger was sentenced to 1 year of prison and 18 months' probation for assaulting two police officers during the protest on 5 January.

References

1981 births
Living people
French male boxers
Cruiserweight boxers